Ipswich Stadium was a greyhound racing stadium situated in Ipswich, Suffolk.

Origins and Opening
In the early 1930s the site chosen for a new stadium was directly north east of where the River Orwell and River Gipping meet and north of the London Road. It was originally called the Suffolk Stadium and independent racing (unaffiliated to a governing body) had already taken place before an official opening night got underway in 1935.

Promoter Mr Nat Shaw advertised and organised a first meeting described as being under official licensing on Wednesday 11 September 1935. The wording was a public relations exercise because the licensing was that of the County Borough Council and not the National Greyhound Racing Club (NGRC) which was the official organisation to greyhound racing. Nevertheless, the stadium had been re-modelled, covered stands erected in the enclosures and the old kennels replaced. The reconstruction of the track was by Fisk & Co Ltd, the electric trackless hare was installed by H.Blann of London, safety hurdles and track equipment was supplied by Mortimer's of London and finally the wireless was by S.West of Ipswich.

Admission was free on opening night resulting in an attendance of 4,000 to watch the seven races. The first race was a 270-yard race and was won by a greyhound called Comas.

1936-1974

Totalisator turnover in the first two years after the war was £594,645 & £417,101. The track continued throughout the 1950s and 1960s with racing held mainly on Wednesday and Saturday evenings at 7.15pm. The race distances were over 300, 500 and 700 yards and amenities included a licensed bar and snack bar and the totalisator was described as the Union Multi-speed wonder tote. The 405 yard circumference circuit had an 'Outside McKee' hare and the all-grass track was served by a spray watering system.

Affiliated racing
Major change arrived in 1974 when the NGRC offered the chance to independent tracks to race under the NGRC permit scheme, a scheme designed to allow official status at a fraction of the expected cost increases. Ipswich Stadium Ltd under the control of Ernie Wedon took up the offer. Wedon had also been responsible with Len Franklin for Yarmouth Stadium's construction in 1940 and was also Racing Manager at Ipswich. A new stand was built costing £100,000 and a new computerised tote was added. The Suffolk Derby and St Leger became the tracks major events and the first race held under NGRC rules was on 2 February 1974.

Metric changes from yards to metres resulted in race distances of 277, 437 & 647m and during 1977 a new consortium headed by Tom Stanley and Bill Davis took over from Ernie Wedon. Stanley arrived as Director of Racing following the closure of Rayleigh Weir Stadium and Davis was to be the Racing Manager. Further track changes resulted in a new circumference of 375m and race distances of 258, 440, 628 & 810 metres behind an 'Outside Sumner' hare.

Track trainer Tom Lanceman started supplying runners to Southend Stadium in 1979 becoming one of the first dual attachment trainers in the country and Ipswich appointed one of the leading trainers in the country, Joe Cobbold from Cambridge. The Cobbold kennels won the 1980 Scottish Greyhound Derby with Decoy Sovereign, the 1980 TV Trophy with Decoy Boom followed by the Laurels with Echo Spark in 1981.

Scurlogue Champ
Ipswich was connected with the legendary Scurlogue Champ which was trained by local handler Ken Peckham. The greyhound alongside Ballyregan Bob was responsible for a 1980s boom for the entire industry and became a national TV star after winning two BBC Television Trophy competitions in 1985 & 1986.

Closure
Despite the 1980s boom Ipswich failed to flourish and closed its doors on the 17 February 1988. The last winner was Albert Skelton's Ventry Joe. Owner Bill Davis had been told to vacate the premises by the local council who had been informed by the Department of Environment that Bentray Investments had won an appeal to build warehousing on the site next to their Texas superstore business whose parent company was the Ladbroke Group. Davis a former trainer received a reported £2 million in the deal and the site was built on and today is occupied in the area where the Dunelm and the Range stores stand.

Competitions

Suffolk Derby

Track records

References

Defunct greyhound racing venues in the United Kingdom
Defunct sports venues in Suffolk
Sports venues in Ipswich